Sovetskaya is a rural locality (a stanitsa) in Novokubansky District of Krasnodar Krai, Russia, located on the Urup River. Population:

References

Rural localities in Krasnodar Krai